The 1957 Tourist Trophy may refer to the following races:
 The 1957 Isle of Man TT, for Grand Prix Motorcycles
 The 1957 Victorian Tourist Trophy, for sports cars held at Albert Park
 The 1957 Dutch TT, for Grand Prix Motorcycles held at Assen